Nurmo is a former municipality of Finland. It was consolidated, together with Ylistaro to Seinäjoki on 1 January 2009.

It is located in the province of Western Finland and is part of the Southern Ostrobothnia region. The population density was 33.0 inhabitants per km².

The municipality was unilingually Finnish.

Nurmo houses the HQ and main plant of the meat company Atria, which has 1700 local employees.

In early 2007 it was proposed to merge Nurmo with the city of Seinäjoki and the neighbouring municipality of Ylistaro. Consultative referendums were held in all three municipalities. Seinäjoki voted heavily in favour; Ylistaro a bare majority in favour, and Nurmo 3:1 against. However, on 21 May 2007 Nurmo Council agreed to the merger by 18 votes to 17, and the municipality ceased to be an independent entity in 2009.

External links

Municipal homepage 
Church homepage 

Former municipalities of Finland
Seinäjoki
Populated places disestablished in 2009
2009 disestablishments in Finland

no:Ylihärmä